"Circle of Life" is a Disney song from the 1994 animated film The Lion King.

Circle of life may also refer to:

 Circle of life, biological life cycle of procreation, birth, life, and death 
 Circle of life, social circle, a community or subculture of a location
 Circle of life, called Ensō in Zen
 The "circle of life" or "course of nature", a concept mentioned in Christian New Testament in 



Disney
 Sing-Along Songs: Circle of Life, 1994 Disney karaoke version of the song
 Circle of Life: An Environmental Fable, a 1995 Disney film

Music
 Circle of Life, a 1992 album by Magpie (folk duo)
 '"Ben Leef" ("The Circle of Life")', a song by Samira Said
 "Circle of Life", a 2000 song by U.P.O. from the album No Pleasantries
 "Circle of Life", a 2005 song by G4 from the album G4 (album)
 "Circle of Life", a 2006 song by Termanology from the album Out the Gate
 "Circle of Life", a 2008 song by Greek heavy metal band Firewind from the album Live Premonition
 "Circle of Life", the theme song for the 2008 film Kamen Rider Kiva: King of the Castle in the Demon World

Television
 "The Circle of Life", an episode of All Saints, see All Saints (season 11)
 "Circle of Life", an episode of Good Eats, see List of Good Eats DVDs
 "Circle of Life", an episode of Lassie, see Lassie (season 18)
 "The Circle of Life", an episode of Notes from the Underbelly, see List of Notes from the Underbelly episodes
 "Circle of Life", an episode of Walker: Texas Ranger, see List of Walker, Texas Ranger episodes

Literature 

 "Circle of Life", a story by Bruce Coville from the anthology series Bruce Coville's Book of Monsters
 The Circle of Life: Replacing Hardship with Love, a book by Walter Mikac

Other uses 
 Circle of Life (horse)
 Circle of Life Foundation
 Circle of Life Cemetery, a cemetery in Cook County, Illinois

See also
 Life and death (disambiguation)